The South African Medal for War Services is a South African service medal for voluntary unpaid service in support of the war effort between 6 September 1939 and 15 February 1946, during the Second World War.

Institution
In addition to the British war medals which were awarded to combatants from all members of the British Commonwealth, several Commonwealth nations augmented the British awards by establishing their own service medals, all distinctive in design, purpose and criteria.
  
The South African Medal for War Services was instituted by a Royal Warrant dated 29 December 1945, countersigned and sealed at Cape Town on 6 February 1946.

Award criteria
The medal was awarded for part-time unremunerated voluntary service in support of the war effort between 6 September 1939 and 15 February 1946.

Altogether 17,500 medals were awarded to people of both sexes, irrespective of whether or not they were British subjects. The requirement was a minimum of two years’ service, of which at least one year was continuous, rendered voluntarily and without pay within or outside the borders of the Union of South Africa, in one or more of the officially recognised voluntary non-military organisations, such as the Red Cross and the Governor-General's War Fund, with the proviso that five or more hours were worked every week.

Order of wear

In the order of wear prescribed by the British Central Chancery of the Orders of Knighthood, the South African Medal for War Services takes precedence after the Women's Royal Voluntary Service Medal and before the Colonial Special Constabulary Medal.

South Africa

With effect from 6 April 1952, when a new South African set of decorations and medals was instituted to replace the British awards used to date, the older British decorations and medals which were applicable to South Africa continued to be worn in the same order of precedence but, with the exception of the Victoria Cross, took precedence after all South African decorations and medals awarded to South Africans on or after that date. Of the official British medals which were applicable to South Africans, the South African Medal for War Services takes precedence as shown.

  

 Preceded by the Union of South Africa Commemoration Medal.

Description
The medal was struck in silver and is 36 millimetres in diameter and 3 millimetres thick at the raised rim. It is affixed to the suspender by means of claws and a pin through the upper edge of the medal.

Obverse
The obverse depicts the years "1939" over "1945", encircled by a wreath of protea flowers, all of which are surrounded by the name of the medal in English and Afrikaans, "SOUTH AFRICA" and "SUID-AFRIKA" above and "FOR WAR SERVICES • VIR OORLOGDIENSTE" below.

Reverse
The reverse has the Coat of Arms of the Union of South Africa, with the medal number impressed at the bottom on the rim.

Ribbon
The ribbon is 32 millimetres wide, with three equal width bands of dark orange, white and dark blue.

References

Military decorations and medals of South Africa
Military decorations and medals of South Africa pre-1952
Awards established in 1945